Come Hell or High Water is a CD and DVD by the hard rock group Deep Purple. It was recorded on 16 October 1993 at Hanns-Martin-Schleyer-Halle in Stuttgart, Germany and at the NEC in Birmingham on 9 November.

The album is one of the last to feature Ritchie Blackmore, as he quit after the concert on 17 November 1993 in Helsinki, Finland. He was replaced by Joe Satriani for the rest of the tour and later by Steve Morse.

Recording
Blackmore's issues with the presence of a cameraman on his side of the stage at the start of the Birmingham concert prompted the guitarist to return to his dressing room until the cameraman was removed. This leads to a longer than usual guitar-free intro into "Highway Star" and several truncated guitar solo spots through the show. 
The rest of the band's dissatisfaction with the behaviour of their soon-to-be-departed guitarist is evident in their interviews on the DVD.

The CD features songs from the Stuttgart show, with the exception of "Anyone's Daughter", taken from Birmingham.

The full concert versions of the Stuttgart and Birmingham shows were released in 2006 as a four CD box-set Live in Europe 1993 by Sony/BMG, each concert having its own gatefold sleeve and paper CD-liners. In 2007 each show had a separate release, in a jewel-case, but the Birmingham show was soon deleted, due to Ian Gillan's protest about it being re-released.

CD track listing
All songs written by Ritchie Blackmore, Ian Gillan, Roger Glover, Jon Lord and Ian Paice except where indicated.

 "Highway Star" – 6:40
 "Black Night" – 5:40
 "A Twist in the Tale" (Blackmore, Gillan, Glover) – 4:27
 "Perfect Strangers" (Blackmore, Gillan, Glover) – 6:52
 "Anyone's Daughter" – 3:57
 "Child in Time"  – 10:48
 "Anya" (Blackmore, Gillan, Glover, Lord) – 12:13
 "Speed King" – 7:29
 "Smoke on the Water" – 10:26

US/Japanese track listing
 "Highway Star" – 6:40
 "Black Night" – 5:40
 "A Twist in the Tale" (Blackmore, Gillan, Glover) – 4:27
 "Perfect Strangers" (Blackmore, Gillan, Glover) – 6:52
 "Anyone's Daughter" – 3:57
 "Child in Time"  – 10:48
 "Anya" (Blackmore, Gillan, Glover, Lord) – 12:13
 "Lazy" – 4:18
 "Space Truckin'" – 2:39
 "Woman from Tokyo" – 1:53
 "Speed King" – 7:29
 "Smoke on the Water" – 10:26

DVD track listing
 "Highway Star"
 "Black Night"
 "Talk About Love"
 "A Twist in the Tale"
 "Perfect Strangers"
 "Beethoven's Ninth"
 "Knocking at Your Back Door"
 "Anyone's Daughter"
 "Child in Time"
 "Anya"
 "The Battle Rages On"
 "Lazy"
 "Space Truckin'"
 "Woman From Tokyo"
 "Paint It Black"
 "Smoke on the Water"

 Besides the actual concert, there are interpolated interviews of all the band members, except Ritchie Blackmore.

Personnel
Deep Purple
Ian Gillan – vocals
Ritchie Blackmore – guitar
Jon Lord – organ, keyboards
Roger Glover – bass
Ian Paice – drums

Production
Pat Regan – producer, engineer, mixing at New Century Media Studios, Los Angeles
George Marino – mastering at Sterling Sound, New York

Charts

Certifications

References

Deep Purple video albums
1994 live albums
1994 video albums
Live video albums
Deep Purple live albums
RCA Records live albums
Bertelsmann Music Group video albums